James Turley (born 24 June 1981) is an English former professional footballer, currently playing as a winger for Buxton.

Turley began his career as a trainee with York City, turning professional in August 1998. He made his league debut on 18 September 1999, starting in the 2–1 defeat away to Exeter City. He struggled to gain a regular place in the York side and was released in May 2001. He joined Torquay United on trial, playing in the 3-0 friendly win against Clyst Rovers on 31 July, but failed to impress new manager Roy McFarland sufficiently to warrant any further interest.

On 21 August 2001 he signed for Scarborough, who had tried to sign him a year earlier, but made only 4 appearances as a substitute in their Conference side before joining Stalybridge Celtic on 20 October 2001. He moved to Harrogate Town in 2002, and was player of the year in the 2003–04 season. He was linked with moves to Hucknall Town and Barrow in the 2004 close season, but chose to remain with Harrogate.

Turley announced that he would be leaving Harrogate in May 2005 and subsequently rejoined Stalybridge Celtic later that month.

In October 2006, Turley joined Mossley on loan.

Turley joined Witton Albion in June 2007, but moved on again, to Buxton, in September that year.

References

External links

1981 births
Living people
Footballers from Manchester
English footballers
English Football League players
York City F.C. players
Scarborough F.C. players
Stalybridge Celtic F.C. players
Association football wingers
Harrogate Town A.F.C. players
Mossley A.F.C. players
Witton Albion F.C. players
Buxton F.C. players